Apterouridae is a family of millipedes belonging to the order Chordeumatida. Adult millipedes in this family have 30 segments (counting the collum as the first segment and the telson as the last).

Genera:
 Apterourus Loomis, 1966

References

Chordeumatida
Millipede families